East Pomeranian (Ostpommersch) is a East Low German dialect moribund in Europe, which used to be spoken in the region of Farther Pomerania when it was part of the German Province of Pomerania, until World War II, and today is part of Poland. Currently, the language survives mainly in Brazil, where it is spoken by descendants of Germans expelled after the war and where it was given its own script by the linguist Ismael Tressmann. It has co-official status in 11 Brazilian municipalities and has been recognized as a historical and cultural heritage of the Brazilian state of Espírito Santo. East Pomeranian is also spoken in central Wisconsin and parts of Iowa, in the United States.

Nowadays, spoken East Pomeranian has mostly been influenced by Portuguese language and Hunsrik, a German dialect derived from the Hunsrückisch native to Brazil. It excludes the dialect spoken in the United States, known as Wisconsin Pomeranian, which was influenced by the English language. The varieties of East Pomeranian are: Westhinterpommersch, Osthinterpommersch, Bublitzisch around Bobolice and Pommerellisch;
Further the east, German dialects transitioned to Low Prussian-East Pomeranian and Vistula Delta German spoken in and around Danzig/Gdansk.

Brazilian Municipalities that have co-official East Pomeranian dialect

Espírito Santo 
Afonso Cláudio (in the district of Mata Fria)
Domingos Martins
Itarana
Laranja da Terra
Pancas
Santa Maria de Jetibá
Vila Pavão

Minas Gerais 
Itueta (only in the district of Vila Neitzel)

Santa Catarina 
Pomerode

Rio Grande do Sul 
Canguçu
São Lourenço do Sul (under approval)

Rondonia 
Espigão d'Oeste (under approval)

See also
 Brazilian German
 West Pomeranian dialect

References

External links
Pommerscher Verein Central Wisconsin
Law Co-formalizing East Pomeranian in the Municipality of Pancas
Law Co-formalizing East Pomeranian in the Municipality of Santa Maria de Jetibá
Pomeranian

Low German
German dialects
Languages of Brazil
Languages of Poland
Pomerania
German-Brazilian culture